"Shine on Silver Sun" is a song by English band Strawbs featured on their 1974 album Hero and Heroine. It is written by Dave Cousins and was intended as a "come-back" single after the post-"Part of the Union" band split. The single was a minor success peaking at number 34 in the UK Singles Chart.

B-Side

The B-side track "And Wherefore" is a band composition, not released on any studio album. It forms the second part of the composite song "Why and Wherefore" which appears on the compilation/rarities album Halcyon Days.

Personnel

Dave Cousins – vocals, acoustic guitar
Dave Lambert – backing vocals, electric guitar
Chas Cronk – backing vocals, bass guitar
Rod Coombes – drums
John Hawken – piano, mellotron

References
"Shine on Silver Sun" at Strawbsweb official site

External links 
Lyrics to "Shine on Silver Sun" at Strawbsweb official site
Lyrics to "And Wherefore" at Strawbsweb official site

1973 singles
Strawbs songs
1973 songs
Songs written by Dave Cousins